This is a summary of 2009 in music in the United Kingdom.

Events
4 February - the Official Charts Company launches the Specialist Classical Albums Chart, developed in consultation with the British Phonographic Industry (BPI).
8 February – At the 51st Grammy Awards, Coldplay win three awards including Song of the Year for Viva La Vida and Adele wins two awards including Best New Artist.
2 March – Elton John announces his latest tour with Billy Joel. The duo's previous tour, in 2003, grossed $USD 45.8 million from only 24 sellouts according to Billboard Boxscore.
4 April – Ringo Starr and Paul McCartney perform together (for the first time since 2002) at the Radio City Music Hall for the David Lynch Foundation.
11 April – Susan Boyle's version of the song "I Dreamed a Dream" from the musical Les Misérables on Britain's Got Talent becomes a worldwide sensation, as it is seen over 200 million times on YouTube and other video outlets.
16 May - Alexander Rybak wins the Eurovision Song Contest 2009 in Moscow, for Norway. Within a couple of days, his song, "Fairytale", reaches the top ten in charts in most of Europe, including a No. 10 entry in the UK Singles Chart.  Jade Ewen finishes 5th for the UK with "It's My Time".
17 July, 18 & 21 – Paul McCartney performs three sold-out concerts at Citi Field to open the stadium with The Script.  On 15 August 1965, The Beatles had performed the first concert at Shea Stadium and McCartney joined Billy Joel on stage for the last concert there. Joel joined McCartney again on the first night.
21 August - The Verve break up for the 3rd, and final time.  The split is due to Simon Jones and Nick McCabe no longer on speaking terms with Richard Ashcroft, and their assertion that Ashcroft only reformed the band as a vehicle to relaunch his solo career.
22 August - Oasis perform what would turn out to be their final gig, at V Festival, Staffordshire.  They were supposed to perform the following night there, but cancelled due to reports that Liam Gallagher had laryngitis.
28 August – After another fight with his brother Liam, Noel Gallagher leaves Oasis. Initial reports shortly afterwards suggested that Oasis had broken up, but Liam denied this. The remaining members of Oasis eventually decide to discontinue the band name and start recording under a new name, Beady Eye.
9 September – The entire catalogue of The Beatles is re-released as digital remasters with rare pictures, short documentaries, original and newly written liner notes with replicated original UK artwork for the first time since 1987.
The Beatles: Rock Band is released.
16 September – Four of the Spice Girls reunite for dinner and drinks in London, the exception being Posh Spice, who was in Los Angeles. It was the first time all had reunited in public since their "Return of the Spice Girls Tour" in 2007/8. 
21 September - Sugababes singer Keisha Buchanan leaves the group, surrounding days of speculation that arguments had occurred in the band. 2009 Eurovision song contest entrant Jade Ewen replaced her, leaving no members of the group's original lineup remaining.
11 October – Robbie Williams makes his first appearance on TV in over 3 years with "Bodies" on The X Factor.
12 October - Ash begin releasing the first of 26 singles, known as the "A-Z Series", where they would release one single every fortnight, through digital download and 7" vinyl for a year. But despite much publicity and press attention, none of the singles reach the UK Top 40.
24 October – Lock Up play their final show.
25 October – Cheryl's début solo single "Fight For This Love" reaches number one.
13 December – Joe McElderry wins the sixth series of The X Factor UK. Olly Murs is named runner-up, while Stacey Solomon and Danyl Johnson finish in third and fourth place respectively.
20 December – Rage Against the Machine takes the Christmas number one slot in the United Kingdom with "Killing in the Name", after a massive Facebook campaign to prevent the winner of The X Factor from taking the slot once again.
26 December - Nowhere Boy, a biopic about the young John Lennon, is released in the UK.

UK Charts

Classical music
Richard Barrett – Mesopotamia, for 17 instruments and electronics
Harrison Birtwistle – The Corridor, scena for two singers and ensemble
John Brunning – Sahara (for guitar)
Howard Goodall – Enchanted Voices
John Tavener
Tu ne sais pas, for mezzo-soprano, timpani and stings
The Peace that Passeth Understanding (choral)
Mark-Anthony Turnage – Five Processionals, for clarinet, violin, cello & piano

Opera
Michael Nyman - Sparkie: Cage and Beyond

Film and incidental music
Neil Brand - The Wrecker

Musical theatre
Dreamboats and Petticoats

Musical films
Afghan Star

Music awards

BRIT Awards
The 2009 BRIT Awards were hosted by James Corden, Matthew Horne and Kylie Minogue on 18 February 2009 at Earls Court Exhibition Centre in London.

British Male Solo Artist: Paul Weller
British Female Solo Artist: Duffy
British Breakthrough Act: Duffy
British Group: Elbow
British Live Act: Iron Maiden Somewhere Back in Time World Tour
British Single: Girls Aloud "The Promise"
MasterCard British Album: Duffy - Rockferry
International Male Solo Artist: Kanye West
International Female Solo Artist: Katy Perry
International Group: Kings of Leon
International Album: Kings of Leon - Only By the Night
Critic's Choice: Florence And The Machine
Outstanding Contribution to Music: Pet Shop Boys
Producer's Award: Bernard Butler

The Classical BRIT Awards were hosted by Myleene Klass on 14 May.
Male of the Year — Gustavo Dudamel
Female of the Year — Alison Balsom
Composer of the Year — Howard Goodall
Young British Classical Performer — Alina Ibragimova
Album of the Year — Royal Scots Dragoon Guards Spirit of the Glen–Journey
Soundtrack of the Year — The Dark Knight — Hans Zimmer and James Newton Howard
Critics' Award — Sir Charles Mackerras/Scottish Chamber Orchestra — Mozart Symphonies nos. 38-41
Lifetime Achievement In Music — José Carreras

British Composer Awards
Contemporary Jazz Composition - Jason Yarde

Ivor Novello Awards
Best TV soundtrack - Wallace and Gromit: A Matter of Loaf and Death
Most performed work - Duffy, "Mercy" 
PRS most performed work - Coldplay, "Viva La Vida"
Inspiration Award - Edwyn Collins
Classical Music Award - James MacMillan
Outstanding song collection - Vince Clarke
Songwriter of the year - Eg White

Mercury Music Prize
Speech Debelle – Speech Therapy

Deaths
9 January – Dave Dee, singer (Dave Dee, Dozy, Beaky, Mick & Tich), 67 (prostate cancer)
14 January – Angela Morley, conductor and composer, 84
15 January - Jean Adebambo, singer, 46 (suicide)
29 January – John Martyn, singer/songwriter, 60
9 February – Vic Lewis, jazz guitarist, 89
19 February - Kelly Groucutt, bass guitarist (Electric Light Orchestra), 63
1 March – Joan Turner, singer and actress, 86
10 April - Richard Arnell, composer, 91
6 July   – Johnny Collins, singer, 71
17 July – Gordon Waller, singer (Peter and Gordon), 64
5 October – Mike Alexander, bassist (Evile), 32 (pulmonary embolism)
7 October - Helen Watts, operatic contralto, 81
12 October - Ian Wallace, singer, 90
15 November – Derek B, rapper, 44
24 November - Amy Black, operatic mezzo-soprano, 36 (heart condition)
2 December – Eric Woolfson, musician (The Alan Parsons Project), 64
28 December - Jimmy 'the rev' Sullivan

See also
2009 in British radio
2009 in British television
2009 in the United Kingdom
List of British films of 2009

References

 
2009